The women's 3 metre springboard competition at 2013 World Aquatics Championships was held on July 26 with the preliminary round and semifinal and the final on July 27.

Results
The preliminary round was held on July 26 at 10:00 and the semifinal at 14:00 with the final on July 27 at 17:30.

Green denotes finalists

Blues denotes semifinalists

References

Women's 3 m springboard